Amarkot Fort (Sindhi: عمر ڪوٽ جو قلعو), 
is a fort located in Umerkot, Sindh, also called Amarkot (Sindhi:امرڪوٽ), Umerkot was founded and ruled By Sodha Rajputs of Parmar Dynasty. It was named after its founder Rana Amar Singh Sodha. Emperor Akbar was born in Umarkot Fort when his father Humayun fled from the military defeats at the hands of Sher Shah Suri on 15 October 1542. Rana Prasad Singh Sodha of Umarkot, who had risen to power, had given refuge to Mughal Emperor Humayun, and it was there Hamida Bano Begum gave birth to young Akbar. Later the Mughal Emperor Akbar became the Shahenshah of Hindustan and was a popular figure with both Hindus and Muslims. Umerkot has many sites of historical significance such as Mughal emperor Akbar's birthplace near to Umarkot Fort. Currently, King Akbar birthplace is an open land. In 1746, the Mughal Subahdar, Noor Mohammad Kalhoro, built a fort at the location. Later the British took over that area.

Amarkot Fort was built by Rana Amar Singh in 11th century. It remained under control of Sodha Hindu Rajput dynasty known as the Ranas of Umerkot, but later was taken over by the Pakistani Government after the formation of Pakistan. However, the Rana family still has their jagir located 16 km away. The governorship of the fort was possessed by Rana Megraj.

Folklore 
Another significant story relating to Umarkot is that of Umar Marvi. Marvi was a young Thari girl abducted by Umar, the then ruler, who wanted to marry her because of her beauty. Upon her refusal, she was imprisoned in the historic Umerkot Fort for many years until her ultimate release. Because of her courage, Marvi is an ideal for the local people.

See also
List of World Heritage Sites in Pakistan
List of forts in Pakistan
List of museums in Pakistan
 Umerkot

References 

Forts in Sindh
Umerkot District
Rajput architecture